The 1985–86 Miami Redskins men's basketball team represent Miami University in the 1985–86 NCAA Division I men's basketball season. The Redskins, led by 2nd-year head coach Jerry Peirson, played their home games at Millett Hall in Oxford, Ohio as members of the Mid-American Conference. The team won the conference regular season title, but lost to Ball State in the championship game of the MAC tournament. The Redskins received an at-large bid to the NCAA tournament as the No. 10 seed in the Midwest region. Miami was beaten by the No. 7 seed Iowa State Cyclones in the opening round, 81–79 in OT on a buzzer beater by Jeff Hornacek. The Redskins did not fare well in overtime games this season as each one of their last four losses of the season was an overtime game.

Senior Ron Harper was again named MAC Player of the Year, and added to his list of school records. At the finish of the season, Harper owned school records for career points, rebounds, steals, and blocks. He was also fourth in career assists.

Roster

Schedule and results

|-
!colspan=9 style=| Non-conference regular season

|-
!colspan=9 style=| MAC regular season

|-
!colspan=9 style=| MAC tournament

|-
!colspan=9 style=| NCAA tournament

Source

Awards and honors
Ron Harper – Consensus Second-team All-American, MAC Player of the Year (2x)

1986 NBA Draft

References

Miami RedHawks men's basketball seasons
Miami (OH)
Miami (OH)